Aggrey House was a hostel established in London in 1934 to cater for African students and students of African descent.  It was named after James Emman Kwegyir Aggrey. It was at 47 Doughty Street, a typical Georgian terraced house, on the recommendations made by a Colonial Office committee in 1930.

Ivor Cummings was appointed Warden in 1935. He was responsible for organising meetings, lectures, dances and other social events for the residents.

In 1943 new premises were obtained at 17 Russell Square where Aggrey House was reopened as "The Colonial Centre", intended to cater for all classes of Colonial students, as well as both members of the armed forces and civilian was workers.

References

Hostels
1934 establishments in England
1943 disestablishments